"Take a Little Trip" is a song written by Ronnie Rogers and Mark Wright, and recorded by American country music group Alabama. It was released in June 1992 as the first single from their album, American Pride. The song reached number 2 on the Billboard Hot Country Singles & Tracks chart in August 1992.

Critical reception
Deborah Evans Price, of Billboard magazine reviewed the song favorably, calling the band "ever economical" but saying that they opt to "make the most of what they've got-to a very determined and assertive beat."

Chart performance
"Take a Little Trip" debuted at number 61 on the U.S. Billboard Hot Country Singles & Tracks for the week of June 6, 1992.

Year-end charts

References

1992 singles
Alabama (American band) songs
Songs written by Ronnie Rogers
Songs written by Mark Wright (record producer)
Song recordings produced by Josh Leo
RCA Records Nashville singles
1992 songs